XHAFA-FM is a radio station on 99.3 FM in Coatzacoalcos, Veracruz, Mexico, broadcasting from a transmitter at Nanchital.

History
XEUY-AM 1580 received its concession on October 30, 1971. It was owned by Alberto Elorza García, who remained the concessionaire until 2015, and broadcast from Las Choapas with 250 watts day and 100 watts night. By the early 1990s, XEUY had moved to Nanchital and 690 kHz, with 2.5 kW daytime power. In 1999, the call sign was changed to XEAFA-AM.

XEAFA was cleared for AM-FM migration in 2010 as XHAFA-FM 99.3.

In April 2022, the station dropped Heraldo Radio and flipped to Activa, the format previously on XHGB-FM from 2020 to 2022.

References

Radio stations in Veracruz
Radio stations established in 1971
1971 establishments in Mexico